Henry Smith Leiper (17 September 1891 – 22 January 1975) was a missionary. He was an ecumenist active in countries affected by Nazism.

References

American Protestant missionaries
1891 births
1975 deaths